Ensete superbum is a species of banana from India.

Distribution
The plant is well-known from the Western Ghats, Anaimalai Hills, some other South Indian hills in Dindigul and other parts of the peninsular India. It has also been recorded from Jhadol and Ogna forest ranges in Rajasthan, North India. There are also reports of a similar species in Thailand, but it is yet to be formally described.

Description

Plants may grow up to 12 ft in height and the pseudostem may be up to half the height with a swollen base of up to 8 ft in circumference at the base. The leaves are bright green in colour on both sides with a deeply grooved and short petiole. The leaf sheaths are persistent at the base and leave closely set scars on the corm. The fruits are about 3 inches long and more or less triangular with dark brown seeds. The upper parts of the plant die out during the dry season leaving the corm, which forms new leaves at the beginning of the monsoon.

References

External links

Biodiversity Of India wiki: Ensete superbum
Globalnet.co.uk: images of Ensete superbum

superbum
Flora of Karnataka
Flora of Kerala
Flora of Rajasthan
Flora of Tamil Nadu
Flora of India (region)
South Western Ghats montane rain forests
Garden plants of Asia
Medicinal plants of Asia
Tropical fruit